Not Waving But Drowning is a 2012  drama film directed by Devyn Waitt, starring Vanessa Ray and Megan Guinan. A small town girl (Vanessa Ray) moves to New York City, and laments being separated from her best friend (Megan Guinan) while forging rewarding new relationships in director Devyn Waitt's feature-length companion piece to the short film The Most Girl Part of You (2011).

The film premiered in the 2012 Champs-Élysées Film Festival in Paris, France.

Plot summary
The title is a reference to a poem of the same name by English poet Stevie Smith, in which a dead man berates those who failed to notice or acknowledge the circumstances leading to his death.

Leaving small-town life in her dust, Adele moves wide-eyed to New York City, and her best friend Sara is stuck in their boring hometown. Separate for the first time in their lives, the film charts their new relationships, while beautiful background music sequences capture fleeting emotions as their lives move in unexpected directions.

Cast
 Vanessa Ray as Adele
 Megan Guinan as Sara
 Lynn Cohen as Sylvia
 Scott Bryce as Damon
 Adam Driver as Adam
 Isabelle McNally as Kim
 Lili Reinhart as Amy
 Ryan Munzert as Big Guy
 Keith Pratt as Keith
 Elizabeth Fendrick as Maggie
 Ross Francis	
 Trinity Rose Smith as Lila

References

External links 
 
 
 

2012 films
2012 thriller drama films
2012 psychological thriller films
American thriller drama films
American psychological thriller films
Films set in New York City
2012 drama films
2010s English-language films
2010s American films